Lizard Pond is located in the Adirondack Mountains southwest of Garnet Lake, New York. Fish species present in the lake are brook trout, and black bullhead. There is carry down trail access off Garnet Lake on the southeast shore.

References

Lakes of New York (state)
Lakes of Warren County, New York